Polavieja (Polavieya in Asturian language) is one of eight parishes in Navia, a municipality within the province and autonomous community of Asturias, in northern Spain.

Villages
 Artedo (L'artedu) 
 Caborno (Cabornu) 
 El Bidulare (El Vidural) 
 Carvajal (El Carbayal) 
 Las Escas 
 Polavieja (La Polavieya) 
 San Miguel de los Eiros (Samigaldeiros) 
 Villabona

Parishes in Navia